The Procter & Gamble Company (P&G) is an American multinational consumer goods corporation headquartered in Cincinnati, Ohio, founded in 1837 by William Procter and James Gamble. It specializes in a wide range of personal health/consumer health, personal care and hygiene products; these products are organized into several segments including beauty; grooming; health care; fabric and home care; and baby, feminine, and family care. Before the sale of Pringles to Kellogg's, its product portfolio also included food, snacks, and beverages. P&G is incorporated in Ohio.

In 2014, P&G recorded $83.1 billion in sales. On August 1, 2014, P&G announced it was streamlining the company, dropping and selling off around 100 brands from its product portfolio in order to focus on the remaining 65 brands, which produced 95% of the company's profits. A.G. Lafley, the company's chairman and CEO until October 2015, said the future P&G would be "a much simpler, much less complex company of leading brands that's easier to manage and operate".

Jon Moeller is the current president and CEO of P&G.

History

Origins 
Candlemaker William Procter, born in England, and soap maker James Gamble, born in Ireland, both emigrated to the US from the United Kingdom. They settled in Cincinnati, Ohio, initially and met when they married sisters Olivia and Elizabeth Norris. Alexander Norris, their father-in-law, persuaded them to become business partners, and in 1837, Procter & Gamble was created.

In 1858–1859, sales reached $1 million. By that point, about 80 employees worked for Procter & Gamble. During the American Civil War, the company won contracts to supply the Union Army with soap and candles. In addition to the increased profits experienced during the war, the military contracts introduced soldiers from all over the country to Procter & Gamble's products.

In the 1880s, Procter & Gamble began to market a new product, an inexpensive soap that floated in water. The company called the soap Ivory. William Arnett Procter, William Procter's grandson, began a profit-sharing program for the company's workforce in 1887. By giving the workers a stake in the company, he correctly assumed that they would be less likely to go on strike.

The company began to build factories in other locations in the United States because the demand for products had outgrown the capacity of the Cincinnati facilities. The company's leaders began to diversify its products as well, and in 1911 began producing Crisco, a shortening made of vegetable oils rather than animal fats.

Beginning in the 1880s, P&G advertised its wares in full-page advertisements in many general-interest magazines; by 1921, it had become a major international corporation with a diversified line of soaps, toiletries, and food products; in that year, its annual advertising budget reached $1 million. 
In the 1920s, P&G advertised its products on the new medium of radio, and from 1932 forward was one of the biggest sponsors of daytime serials, which soon acquired the nickname of soap operas.  In the television era, P&G sponsored and produced some twenty soap operas across six decades before the last of its shows ended in 2010.

International expansion 
The company moved into other countries, both in terms of manufacturing and product sales, becoming an international corporation with its 1930 acquisition of the Thomas Hedley Co., based in Newcastle upon Tyne, England. After this acquisition, Procter & Gamble had their UK Headquarters at 'Hedley House' in Newcastle upon Tyne, until quite recently, when they moved to The Heights, Brooklands. Numerous new products and brand names were introduced over time, and Procter & Gamble began branching out into new areas. The company introduced Tide laundry detergent in 1946 and Prell shampoo in 1947. In 1955, Procter & Gamble began selling the first toothpaste to contain fluoride, known as Crest. Branching out once again in 1957, the company purchased Charmin paper mills and began manufacturing toilet paper and other tissue paper products. Once again focusing on laundry, Procter & Gamble began making Downy fabric softener in 1960 and Bounce fabric softener sheets in 1972. From 1957 to 1968, Procter & Gamble owned Clorox, the leading American manufacturer of liquid bleach; however, the Federal Trade Commission challenged the acquisition, and the U.S. Supreme Court decided against P&G in April 1967.

One of the most revolutionary products to come out on the market was the company's disposable Pampers diaper, first test-marketed in 1961, the same year Procter & Gamble came out with Head & Shoulders. Prior to this point, disposable diapers were not popular, although Johnson & Johnson had developed a product called Chux. Babies always wore cloth diapers, which were leaky and labor-intensive to wash. Pampers provided a convenient alternative, albeit at the environmental cost of more waste requiring landfilling. Amid the recent concerns parents have voiced on the ingredients in diapers, Pampers launched Pampers Pure collection in 2018, which is a "natural" diaper alternative.

Further developments 
Procter & Gamble acquired a number of other companies that diversified its product line and significantly increased profits. These acquisitions included Folgers Coffee, Norwich Eaton Pharmaceuticals (the makers of Pepto-Bismol), Richardson-Vicks, Noxell (Noxzema), Shulton's Old Spice, Max Factor, the Iams Company, and Pantene, among others. In 1994, the company made headlines for big losses resulting from leveraged positions in interest rate derivatives, and subsequently sued Bankers Trust for fraud; this placed their management in the unusual position of testifying in court that they had entered into transactions that they were not capable of understanding. In 1996, P&G again made headlines when the Food and Drug Administration approved a new product developed by the company, Olestra. Also known by its brand name 'Olean', Olestra is a lower-calorie substitute for fat in cooking potato chips and other snacks.

In January 2005, P&G announced the acquisition of Gillette, forming the largest consumer goods company and placing Unilever into second place. This added brands such as Gillette razors, Duracell, Braun, and Oral-B to their stable. The acquisition was approved by the European Union and the Federal Trade Commission, with conditions to a spinoff of certain overlapping brands. P&G agreed to sell its SpinBrush battery-operated electric toothbrush business to Church & Dwight, and Gillette's Rembrandt toothpaste line to Johnson & Johnson. The deodorant brands Right Guard, Soft and Dri, and Dry Idea were sold to Dial Corporation. In 2001, Liquid Paper and Gillette's stationery division, Paper Mate, were sold to Newell Rubbermaid. The companies officially merged on October 1, 2005. In 2008, P&G branched into the record business with its sponsorship of Tag Records, as an endorsement for TAG Body Spray.

P&G's dominance in many categories of consumer products makes its brand management decisions worthy of study. For example, P&G's corporate strategists must account for the likelihood of one of their products cannibalizing the sales of another.

On August 25, 2009, the Ireland-based pharmaceutical company Warner Chilcott announced they had bought P&G's prescription-drug business for $3.1 billion.

P&G exited the food business in 2012 when it sold its Pringles snack food business to Kellogg's for $2.75 billion after the $2.35 billion deal with former suitor Diamond Foods fell short. The company had previously sold Jif peanut butter, Crisco shortening and oils, and Folgers coffee in separate transactions to fellow Ohio-based company Smucker's.

In April 2014, the company sold its Iams pet food business in all markets excluding Europe to Mars, Inc. for $2.9 billion. It sold the European Iams business to Spectrum Brands in December 2014.

Restructuring 
In August 2014, P&G announced it was streamlining the company, dropping around 100 brands and concentrating on the remaining 65, which were producing 95% of the company's profits.

In March 2015, the company divested its Vicks VapoSteam U.S. liquid inhalant business to Helen of Troy, part of a brand-restructuring operation. This deal was the first health-related divestiture under the brand-restructuring operation. The deal included a fully paid-up license to the Vicks VapoSteam trademarks and the U.S. license of P&G's Vicks VapoPad trademarks for scent pads. Most Vicks VapoSteam and VapoPads are used in Vicks humidifiers, vaporizers and other health care devices already marketed by Helen of Troy.

Later that same year in July, the company announced the sale of 43 of its beauty brands to Coty, a beauty-product manufacturer, in a US$13 billion deal. It cited sluggish growth of its beauty division as the reason for the divestiture. The sale was completed on October 3, 2016.

In February 2016, P&G completed the transfer of Duracell to Berkshire Hathaway through an exchange of shares.

In December 2018, Procter & Gamble completed the acquisition of the consumer health division of Merck Group (known as EMD Serono in North America) for €3.4 billion ($4.2 billion) and renamed it as Procter & Gamble Health Limited in May 2019.

In November 2018, P&G unveiled a simpler corporate structure with six business units that will be effective from July 2019.

Finances 
For the fiscal year 2018, Procter & Gamble reported earnings of US$9.750 billion, with an annual revenue of US$66.832 billion, an increase of 2.7% over the previous fiscal cycle. Procter & Gamble's Shares traded at over $86 per share in 2017, and its market capitalization was valued at over US$221.5 billion in October 2018. Procter & Gamble ranked No. 42 on the 2018 Fortune 500 list of the largest United States corporations by total revenue.

Carbon footprint
Procter & Gamble reported Total CO2e emissions (Direct + Indirect) for the twelve months ending 31 December 2020 at 2,619 Kt (-1,441 /-35.5% y-o-y). In September 2021, P&G set a new ambition to achieve net zero emissions across its operations and supply chain by 2040.

Operations
, the company structure has been categorized into ten categories and six selling and market organizations.
 Categories

Management and staff 

Board of Directors

The board of directors of Procter & Gamble currently has 12 members.

Previous members of the board include:
 W. James McNerney, Jr.
 Nelson Peltz
 Scott Cook
 Frank Blake

In May 2011, Fortune editor-at-large Patricia Sellers praised P&G's board diversity, as five of the company's 11 directors were female and had all been on Fortune's annual Most Powerful Women list.

In March 2011, Rajat Gupta resigned from the board after a SEC accusation of Galleon Group insider trading.

In May 2013, Robert A. McDonald announced his retirement and was replaced by A.G. Lafley, who returned as chairman, president, and CEO.

Procter & Gamble is a member of the U.S. Global Leadership Coalition, a Washington, DC-based coalition of over 400 major companies and NGOs that advocates for a larger international affairs budget, which funds American diplomatic and development efforts abroad.

Senior Executives
 Executive Chairman of the Board –  David S. Taylor
 President & Chief Executive Officer – Jon R. Moeller
 Chief Operating Officer – Shailesh G. Jejurikar

Employer recognition 
Fortune magazine awarded P&G a top spot on its list of "Global Top Companies for Leaders", and ranked the company at 15th place of the "World's Most Admired Companies" list. Chief Executive magazine named P&G the best overall company for leadership development in its list of the "40 Best Companies for Leaders".

In October 2008, P&G was named one of "Canada's Top 100 Employers" by Mediacorp Canada Inc. and was featured in Maclean's newsmagazine. Later that month, P&G was also named one of Greater Toronto's Top Employers, which was announced by the Toronto Star newspaper.

In October 2013, the company was named the fourth-most in-demand employer in the world according to analytic data sourced by LinkedIn.

In August 2013, P&G was named the 14th-hardest company to interview for by Glassdoor. In November 2013, Glassdoor also named them as a top 25 company for career opportunities. In February 2014, Glassdoor placed P&G 34th on their annual Best Places to Work list.

In November 2014, P&G came out publicly in support of same-sex marriage in a statement made by William Gipson, P&G's chief global diversity officer.

In November 2015, P&G was named the Careers in Africa Employer of Choice 2015 following a survey of over 13,000 African professionals from across the globe. P&G was also recognized as the most desirable FMCG business to work for in Africa.

In 2016 and 2017, P&G was recognized as one of Forbes World's Most Reputable Companies.

Brands

As of 2015, 21 of P&G's brands have more than a billion dollars in net annual sales. Most of these brands—including Bounty, Crest, Always, and Tide—are global products available on several continents. P&G's products are available in North America, Latin America, Europe, the Middle East, Africa, Asia, Australia, and New Zealand.

In 2018, P&G's fabric and home care division accounted for 32% of the company's total net sales, the highest of all its divisions. The division includes Downy, Gain, Tide, Febreze, and Dawn.

According to Advertising Age, Procter & Gamble spent $4.3 billion advertising their various brands in the United States in 2015, making it the top advertiser in the country.

Manufacturing operations are based in these countries:

Competitive innovation 
In the 2021 review of WIPO's annual World Intellectual Property Indicators Procter & Gamble ranked ninth in the world, with 57 designs in industrial design registrations being published under the Hague System during 2020. This position is down on their previous sixth-place ranking for 65 industrial design registrations being published in 2019.

Radio and television production 
Procter & Gamble produced and sponsored the first radio serial dramas in the 1930s. As the company was known for Ivory soap, the serials became known as "soap operas". With the rise of television in the 1950s and 1960s, most of the new serials were sponsored,  produced and owned (20 series) by the company (including The Guiding Light, which had begun as a radio serial, and made the transition to television lasting 72 years). Though the last P&G-produced show, As the World Turns, left the air in 2010, The Young and the Restless, produced by Sony Pictures Television and broadcast on CBS, is still partially sponsored by Procter & Gamble; as of 2017, it is the only remaining daytime drama that is partially sponsored by Procter & Gamble.

These past serials were produced by Procter & Gamble:

 Another World
 As the World Turns
 The Brighter Day
 The Catlins
 The Edge of Night
 The First Hundred Years
 From These Roots
 Guiding Light
 Lovers and Friends / For Richer, for Poorer
 Our Private World
 Search for Tomorrow
 Somerset
 Texas
 Young Doctor Malone

Procter & Gamble also was the first company to produce and sponsor a prime-time serial, a 1965 spin-off of As the World Turns called Our Private World. In 1979, PGP produced Shirley, a prime-time NBC series starring Shirley Jones, which lasted 13 episodes. They also produced TBS' first original comedy series, Down to Earth, which ran from 1984 to 1987 (110 episodes were produced). They also distributed the syndicated comedy series Throb. In 1985, they produced a game-show pilot called The Buck Stops Here with Taft Entertainment Television in 1985, hosted by Jim Peck; it was not picked up. Procter & Gamble Productions originally co-produced Dawson's Creek with Columbia TriStar Television, but withdrew before the series premiere due to early press reviews. They also produced the 1991 TV movie A Triumph of the Heart: The Ricky Bell Story, which was co-produced by The Landsburg Company, and continue to produce the People's Choice Awards until the show was sold to E! channel in April 2017. In 2007, PGP teamed up with the now-defunct Cookie Jar Group to produce the Flash-animated children's series Will and Dewitt, which features the character Dewitt, the mascot for the Pampers baby product line's former sub-brand, Kandoo.

They attempted with Walmart the Family Movie Night on broadcast networks in 2010–2011 then the Walden Family Theater on the Hallmark Channel in 2013.

In 2013, PGP rebranded itself as Procter & Gamble Entertainment (PGE) with a new logo and an emphasis on multiple-platform entertainment production.

P&G funded a six-episode series, Activate, on National Geographic in 2019 focusing on extreme poverty, inequality and sustainability in conjunction with not-for-profit Global Citizen and production company Radical Media. The company agreed to a longform series deal with Stone Village Television in January 2020. In February 2020, P&G joined Imagine Documentaries' five project slate including Mars 2080, the project closest to production.

Sponsorships 
In addition to its self-produced items through PGE, Procter & Gamble also supports many Spanish-language novellas through advertising on all networks: Azteca América, Estrella TV, Galavisión, Telemundo, UniMás and Univisión. P&G was one of the first mainstream advertisers on Spanish-language TV during the mid-1980s.

In 2008, P&G expanded into music sponsorship when it joined Island Def Jam to create Tag Records, named after a body spray that P&G acquired from Gillette. In 2010, after the cancellation of As the World Turns, PGP announced they were phasing out soap opera production and expanding into more family-appropriate programming.

Procter & Gamble also gave a $100,000 contract to the winners of Cycles 1 through 3 of Canada's Next Top Model, wherein Andrea Muizelaar, Rebecca Hardy, and Meaghan Waller won the prize.

Procter & Gamble has been a major sponsor of the Summer Olympics since 2012. It sponsored 150 athletes at the London games that year. They have also sponsored the Winter Olympics since 2014. It will do so at the 2024 Summer Olympics in Paris, France besides the 2026 Winter Olympics in Cortina d'Ampezzo/Milan, Italy. The company's sponsorship includes television ads in which Olympic athletes are portrayed as children to convey the sense that the mothers of these athletes still remember them as infants; other ads stress how Olympic mothers stood by their children through years of training all the way through to Olympic success. 2016's ad for the Rio Games notes upheavals as youths by an American gymnast, Chinese swimmer, Brazilian volleyballer, and German distance runner.  The ads all make prominent use of the Ludovico Einaudi orchestral track "Divenire" and related such instrumentals.

The company has actively developed or sponsored numerous online communities, e.g. BeingGirl.com (launched in 2000) and Women.com. , the company had 72 "highly stylized destination sites".

Controversies

Price fixing 
In April 2011, P&G was fined €211.2 million by the European Commission for establishing a price-fixing cartel for washing powder in Europe along with Unilever, which was fined €104 million, and Henkel. Though the fine was set higher at first, it was discounted by 10% after P&G and Unilever admitted running the cartel. As the provider of the tip-off leading to investigations, Henkel was not fined.

Toxic shock syndrome and tampons
"In the wake of the toxic shock syndrome outbreak of the 1980s" P&G's Rely left the market.

Toxic shock syndrome (TSS) is a disease caused by strains of the bacteria Staphylococcus aureus. Most people have these bacteria living in their bodies as harmless commensals in places such as the nose, skin, and vagina. The disease can strike anyone, not only women, but the disease is often associated with tampons.
In 1980, 814 menstrual-related TSS cases were reported; 38 deaths resulted from the disease. The majority of women in these cases were documented as using super-absorbent synthetic tampons, particularly the Rely tampon created by Procter & Gamble. Unlike other tampons made of cotton and rayon, Rely used carboxymethylcellulose and compressed beads of polyester for absorption.

In the summer of 1980, the Centers for Disease Control released a report explaining how these bacterial mechanisms were leading to TSS. They also stated that the Rely tampon was associated with TSS more than any other brand of tampon. In September 1980, Procter & Gamble voluntarily recalled its Rely brand of tampons from the market and agreed to provide for a program to notify consumers. Since the 1980s, reported cases of TSS have dramatically decreased.

Not all lawsuits following a death result in awards.

Child labor and forced labor 
According to a 2016 report by Amnesty International, palm oil provider Wilmar International, the world's biggest palm oil grower in 2016 and supplier of raw materials to Procter & Gamble, profited from 8 to 14-year-old child labor and forced labor. Some workers were extorted, threatened, or not paid for work. Some workers also suffered severe injuries from toxic banned chemicals.

Animal testing 
Procter & Gamble has received criticism from animal advocacy group PETA for the practice of testing on animals.

On June 30, 1999, Procter & Gamble announced that it would limit its animal testing practices to its food and drug products which represented less than 20% of its product portfolio. The company invested more than $275 million in the development of alternative testing methods.

Other products 
In 2002, P&G was sued for its ads falsely suggesting to the consumers that the drug Prilosec could cure heartburn in a day. In December 2005, the Pharmaceutical division of P&G was involved in a dispute over research involving its osteoporosis drug Actonel. The case was discussed in the media.

Logo myth 

P&G's former logo originated in 1851 as a crude cross that barge workers on the Ohio River painted on cases of P&G star candles to identify them. P&G later changed this symbol into a trademark that showed a man in the Moon overlooking 13 stars, said to commemorate the original Thirteen Colonies.

The company received unwanted media publicity in the 1980s due to rumors, spread largely by Amway distributors, that the Moon-and-stars logo was a satanic symbol. The accusation was based on a particular passage in the Bible, specifically Revelation 12:1, which states: "And there appeared a great wonder in heaven; a woman clothed with the sun, the moon under her feet and upon her head a crown of 12 stars." P&G's logo consisted of a man's face on the Moon surrounded by 13 stars. Some claimed that the logo was a mockery of the heavenly symbol alluded to in the aforementioned verse, thus construing the logo to be satanic. Where the flowing beard meets the surrounding circle, three curls were said to be a mirror image of the number 666, or the reflected number of the beast. At the top and bottom, the hair curls in on itself and was said to be the two horns like those of a ram. The moon-and-stars logo was claimed to be discontinued in 1985 in a failed attempt to quash the rumors. In 1991, details of the logo were simplified to avoid the connection and remove aspects alleged to indicate Satanist affiliations. The company moved to a text-only logo in 1995, though in 2013 it unveiled a new logo with a hint of a crescent moon behind the text.

These interpretations have been denied by company officials and no evidence linking the company to the Church of Satan or any other occult organization has ever been presented. The company unsuccessfully sued Amway from 1995 to 2003 over rumors forwarded through a company voice-mail system in 1995. In 2007, the company successfully sued individual Amway distributors for reviving and propagating the false rumors. The Church of Satan denies being supported by Procter & Gamble.

Reverse domain name hijacking
In March 2013, P&G was found by a World Intellectual Property Organization panel to have engaged in reverse domain hijacking in an attempt to obtain the domain name "swash.com" from Marchex in a Uniform Domain-Name Dispute-Resolution Policy proceeding. P&G originally stated it had generated more than $40 million in sales of its Swash laundry products over four years, a figure it later revised to $60,000. After losing the case P&G purchased the domain name from Marchex. In 2013 attorney John Berryhill suggested that P&G did not intend to use the swash.com domain to market its existing range, as it had said, but rather a new product described in a 2011 trademark application as "An appliance for domestic use in the nature of a garment steamer for the purpose of removing wrinkles and odors from clothing and linen". Berryhill's theory was shown to be accurate after swash.com went live in June 2014.

"The Talk" 
In 2017, as part of the "My Black is Beautiful" platform, P&G released an advertisement called "The Talk". The advertisement shows African American parents throughout the decades giving their children "the talk" about racism. The advertisement garnered controversy for several different reasons. Some people criticized the advertisement for not showing any fathers giving "the talk", while others accused it of being anti-white. One scene shows a mother warning her daughter about being pulled over by the police. The daughter responds by saying that she is a good driver so her mother doesn't need to worry about her getting a ticket. The mother then implies that she might experience police brutality by being racially profiled and killed. Several police officers and police groups accused that part of the advertisement of being anti-cop. "The Talk" was accused by Michelle Malkin of National Review of being "liberal advertising". Malkin also called the advertisement "Black Lives Matter propaganda" and accused it of pandering and using identity politics. Despite the criticism, the advertisement also received a lot of positive reception and praise with some calling it "powerful" and "thought-provoking". The advertisement has also won several awards including the 2018 Cannes Lions International Festival of Creativity Grand Prix and the 2018 Primetime Emmy Award for Outstanding Commercial during the 70th Primetime Creative Arts Emmy Awards.

International sponsor of war 
The National Agency for the Prevention of Corruption of Ukraine have put P&G on the list of international sponsors of the war. According to the NAPC, P&G has two factories operating in Russia (the Gillette razor manufacturing plant in Saint Petersburg and a toiletries manufacturing plant in Tula oblast), thus contributing to the Russian federal budget and financing Russian war crimes.

Gillette ad 

On January 14, 2019, P&G subsidiary Gillette released a controversial advertisement called "The Best Men Can Be", ostensibly to address negative behavior among men, including bullying, sexism, sexual misconduct, and toxic masculinity. The ad was the subject of controversy and was received negatively by various online commentators, becoming one of the most disliked videos on YouTube.

The ad led to calls for boycott of Gillette and Procter & Gamble.  Later in the year, its Gillette shaving business took an $8 billion write-down in value, although the company and analysts pointed to accumulated currency fluctuations, the entrance of strong rivals and decline in the demand for shaving products since the division's previous valuation in 2005, rather than fallout from the ad.

Corporate diversity 
In January 2019, CEO David Taylor said in Switzerland: "The world would be a better place if my board of directors on down is represented by 50% of the women. We sell our products to more than 50% of the women." Also in January 2019, The Wall Street Journal noted the company's board of directors had more than twice as many men as it does women. As of mid-2020, the board of P&G consisted of an equal number of men and women.

CEO-to-worker pay ratio 
For the first time in 2018, a new Securities and Exchange Commission rule mandated under the 2010 Dodd-Frank financial reform requires publicly traded companies to disclose how their CEOs are compensated in comparison with their employees. In public filings, companies have to disclose their “Pay Ratios,” or the CEO's compensation divided by the median employee's. According to SEC filings, P&G paid its CEO $17,354,256 in 2017.  In 2021, the median employee of Procter & Gamble was compensated $66,326 in 2017, and ratio between CEO pay to median worker pay was 309-to-1, compared to median of 141-to-1 across the S&P500 and the Russell 1000.

References

Further reading 
 Kominicki, John, "James Gamble's Candles and Soap Lit Up Profit: Do It Right: He Helped Put P&G on an Ethical Path to Top", Los Angeles: Investor's Business Daily, March 6, 2015, p. A3.
 McGuigan, Lee, "Procter & Gamble, Mass Media, and the Making of American Life", Media, Culture, and Society 37 (September 2015), pp. 887–903. .

External links 

 
 

 
1837 establishments in Ohio
American companies established in 1837
Branding companies of the United States
Chemical companies of the United States
Companies in the Dow Jones Industrial Average
Companies listed on the New York Stock Exchange
Conglomerate companies of the United States
Dental companies of the United States
Health care companies based in Ohio
Manufacturing companies based in Cincinnati
Manufacturing companies established in 1837
Multinational companies headquartered in the United States
National Medal of Technology recipients
Personal care companies
Pharmaceutical companies of the United States
Pulp and paper companies of the United States